Marcela Pavkovčeková (born 21 April 1977) is a Slovak biathlete. She competed at the 2002 Winter Olympics and the 2006 Winter Olympics.

References

External links
 

1977 births
Living people
Biathletes at the 2002 Winter Olympics
Biathletes at the 2006 Winter Olympics
Slovak female biathletes
Olympic biathletes of Slovakia
Sportspeople from Liptovský Mikuláš
Universiade silver medalists for Slovakia
Universiade medalists in biathlon
Competitors at the 1999 Winter Universiade